Arkansas Judge  is a 1941 American Western film directed by Frank McDonald and starring Roy Rogers, Spring Byington, and Veda Ann Borg.

Premise
Tom Martel, a judge's son, returns to town out West after finishing law school. He becomes involved in a personal feud involving a banker's daughter, Hettie Huston, who attempts to railroad poor scrubwoman Mary Shoemaker in the theft of fifty dollars from a local widow.

Cast
 Roy Rogers as Tom Martel
 Veda Ann Borg as Hettie Huston
 Spring Byington as Mary Shoemaker
 Pauline Moore as Margaret Weaver
 Leon Weaver as Judge Abner Weaver 
 Frank Weaver as Cicero Weaver
 June Weaver as Elviry Weaver
 Eily Malyon as Widow Smithers
 Minerva Urecal as Miranda
 Frank M. Thomas as August Huston
 Minerva Urecal as Miranda Wolfson

External links
 
 Encyclopedia of Arkansas History & Culture entry

1941 films
Republic Pictures films
1941 Western (genre) films
American Western (genre) films
Films with screenplays by Ring Lardner Jr.
Films directed by Frank McDonald
American black-and-white films
1940s English-language films
1940s American films